| Image2      =
| Caption2    =
| DrainsFrom  =
| Source      =
| DrainsTo    =
}}
Parotid lymph nodes are lymph nodes found near the parotid gland in the immune system.

More specifically, it can refer to:
 deep parotid lymph nodes
 superficial parotid lymph nodes

Etymology 

External links
 http://patient.info/health/non-hodgkins-lymphoma-leaflet
 http://www.emedicine.com/ent/topic306.htm#section~anatomy_of_the_cervical_lymphatics

Lymphatics of the head and neck